Chinese flutes come in various types.  They include

Transverse Flutes:
Dizi (and its varieties such as the qudi and bangdi; primary transverse flutes, usually made of bamboo and distinctively has a buzzing membrane)
Koudi (a small center-blown mouth flute with open-ends)
Tuliang (a large center-blown flute with open-ends)
Chi (an ancient center-blown transverse flute with closed ends and front finger holes.)
Hengxiao (dizi without membrane)
Xindi (fully chromatic dizi without membrane)
Jiajian Di (keyed dizi without membrane)

End-Blown Flutes (air split directly on mouthpiece):
Xiao (end-blown vertical bamboo flute)
Gudi, an ancient vertical flute made from the bones of large birds
Paixiao (pan pipes with distinctive notched or curved blowholes to allow for greater expression)
Xun (clay globular flute)
(Uyghur and Mongolian minorities also play a version of the Turkish ney.)

Fipple Flutes (air split through whistle flue duct):
Jiexiao "Sister xiao" (one of many forms of recorder-style flutes)
Dongdi (special recorder-style flute with additional internal reed)
Paidi (fipple pipes)
Taodi and Wudu (Chinese ocarina.)

Free-Reed flutes (use free-reed instead of splitting the airway, but otherwise play in a similar capacity to flute in terms of breath support and fingering.):
Bawu (transverse free-reed flute)
Hulusi (vertical gourd free-reed flute normally with one or two drone pipes)

Chinese flutes are generally made from bamboo (see bamboo flutes) and belong to the bamboo classification of Chinese music, although they can be (and have been) made of other materials such as jade.

References

External links
Ron Korb's Asian Flute Gallery (features descriptions and photos of the dizi, xun, and other Chinese wind instruments
Chinese flute (dizi) finger chart
Extensive displays of Hulusi flute and Bawu flute

Chinese musical instruments
Flutes